Gratiela Brancusi (born 23 July 1989) is a Romanian-born American actress. She is known for her debut role as Noemi in the Paramount+ limited-run series 1883 (2021–2022) and Mayor of Kingstown (2023).

Early life and education
Ioana Gratiela Brancusi was born in Timișoara, Romania, on 23 July 1989. She is not the great-grand-niece of Constantin Brâncuși. Brancusi was raised by her mother after her parents' divorce. Her sister is eleven years older than she. Brancusi is Romani on her father's side.

She studied Journalism at the University of Bucharest and is a member of The Actors’ Gang Theater Ensemble.

Career
Brancusi made her debut in theaters. However, after the COVID-19 pandemic and lockdowns, she started auditioning. In December 2021, Brancusi was announced as Noemi, a Romani widow, in Paramount+ limited-run series 1883. A year later she signed with Elevate Entertainment for management in all areas.

In September 2022, it was announced that Brancusi joined the Mayor of Kingstown cast for the second season. It premiered on January 15, 2023.

Personal life
Brancusi married Tim Robbins on February 1, 2017. They separated on July 1, 2020. The marriage was kept private until Robbins filed for divorce in January 2021.

Apart from acting, she has an interest in photography and reading.

Filmography

Television

References

External links

 
 Instagram

1989 births
21st-century Romanian actresses
Romanian television actresses
Romanian Romani people
Living people
Romani actresses
Romani people
American Romani people
Romanian emigrants to the United States
Romanian people of Greek descent
American people of Greek descent
People from Timișoara
Actors from Timișoara
University of Bucharest alumni
Academic staff of the University of Bucharest